The frenulum of the penis, often known simply as the frenulum (from ), is an elastic band of tissue on the underside of the glans and the neck of the human penis. In men who are not circumcised, it also connects the foreskin to the glans and the ventral mucosa. In adults, the frenulum is typically supple enough to allow manual movement of the foreskin over the glans and help retract the foreskin during erection. In flaccid state it tightens to narrow the foreskin opening. 

In some men, the frenulum may appear shorter than normal, a phenomenon known as frenulum breve. Treatment of frenulum breve may be non surgical, or in other cases, especially with penile chordee, it may include frenulectomy or frenulum lengthening.

Anatomy

The frenulum is a highly vascularized band or ridge of mucosal tissue on the ventral side of the glans and the neck of the penis. It forms the interface between the outer and inner foreskin layers. During gestation, it forms as the lateral edges of the preputial lamina approach in the ventral midline. The two sides of the lamina do not fuse in the midline but remain separated by a thin septum of mesenchyme that will create the preputial frenulum. As part of the glans penis, the frenulum is innervated by divisions of the pudental nerve; the dorsal nerve of the penis and a branch of the perineal nerve. Blood supply to the frenulum is provided by branches of the dorsal artery of the penis that curve around the neck to enter the frenulum and the glans from its ventral surface. It is uncertain whether frenular artery is single or paired. Veinous drainage is thought to occur around the neck of the penis from smaller paired venules. The frenulum occurs on the ventral midline of the glans where the two glans wings fuse forming the septum glandis.

Research
The role of the frenulum in penile erection has been studied in cases of men with short frenula and premature ejaculation. Short frenulum may be associated with unsatisfied intercourse or micro tearings of the mucosa. Treatment with lengthening or reconstruction of the frenulum in uncircumcised and circumcised men was reported to have positive results in satisfied intercourse, prolonged erection and ejaculation. 

For those with spinal cord injuries preventing sensations from reaching the brain, the frenulum just below the glans can be stimulated to produce orgasm and peri-ejaculatory response. It is often a way for those with spinal cord injuries to engage in sexual activities and subsequently feel pleasure.

Clinical significance
Frenulum breve is a condition in which the frenulum is short and restricts the movement of the foreskin, which may or may not interfere with normal sexual activity. The condition can be treated with surgical and non surgical treatment. Non surgical treatment includes strecthing exercises and steroid creams. Surgical treatment includes frenuloplasty; frenulum lengthening or reconstruction, frenectomy and circumcision. Frenulum breve may contribute to frenular chordee, where the glans is pulled toward the vernal body of the penis. Frenulum breve may also be treated by manually expanding the shaft skin by stretching in castration.

The frenulum may be entirely missing in cases of first degree hypospadias.

It is possible for the frenulum to tear during sexual activities. The frenular artery, a branch of the dorsal artery, may be severed, causing significant bleeding.

Frenectomy and frenuloplasty
As a treatment for frenulum breve or frenular chordee a frenectomy can be performed to excise the frenulum from the penis. This is a form of genital frenectomy. This procedure results in a smooth surface. A less invasive treatment which often retains the natural appearance and function of the frenulum to some degree is a frenuloplasty which involves a (partial) incision of the frenulum and realigning the edges to gain more length.

See also 
 Frenum piercing
 Perineal raphe
 Frenuloplasty of prepuce of penis

References

External links 

Circumcision debate
Human penis anatomy
Mammal male reproductive system